Girls of Grace is a compilation album produced by Contemporary Christian group Point of Grace. It was released in 2002 by Word Records.

The album includes several tracks recorded by other female artists of the Christian music scene, including Rachael Lampa, Jennifer Deibler (of FFH), Jaci Velasquez and Joy Williams, as well as three tracks by Point of Grace themselves. It was produced as a soundtrack for a series of weekend conferences and book releases for young women in 2002.

Track listing
 "My Heart Is Set On You" (Point of Grace) - 3:17
 "You Are My All In All" (Nichole Nordeman) - 4:13
 "Breath Of God" (Christy Nockels) - 4:23
 "Every Move I Make" (Out of Eden) - 4:16
 "All I'll Ever Need" (Point Of Grace) - 4:10
 "Promise My Prayers" (Rachael Lampa) - 4:30
 "In The Calm" (Jennifer Deibler) - 3:09
 "The Love Of Christ" (Point Of Grace) - 3:20
 "Trust In The Lord" (Jaci Velasquez and Jill Phillips) - 3:56
 "Live To Worship" (Joy Williams) - 3:33

Singers (Point of Grace)
 Shelley Breen
 Heather Payne
 Denise Jones
 Terry Jones

Point of Grace albums
2002 compilation albums